The 1970-71 Australians lost 2-0 to the touring England team in the 1970-71 Ashes series. Australia had not lost a home Test series since 1954-55, but had suffered a heavy 4-0 defeat in South Africa in 1969-70 which had affected their confidence. On paper they should have had a good team, and E.W. Swanton reckoned they were favourites to hold on to The Ashes, but Rod Marsh, Dennis Lillee and Greg Chappell had yet to mature and Bill Lawry, Garth McKenzie and John Gleeson were at the end of their careers. In more fortunate circumstances the senior players could have eased the newcomers into the team, but Ray Illingworth was a captain who exploited every weakness and they did not get the chance. Their cause was not helped by the selectors Sir Donald Bradman, Sam Loxton and Neil Harvey who chose nineteen different players in the series, nine of them debutants, and continuously chopped and changed the team which did not allow it to settle.

The Captain
It was in South Africa in 1969-70 that his batting, and with it his captaincy, began to falter. The unfortunate experiences he and his men endured in India prior to visiting South Africa, those incidents there and on and off the field, began to affect his outlook, converted it, I feel, into what might be called an inlook...He had to survive investigation of his leadership by the Australian Board of Control in the light of adverse reports from the authorities of both India and South Africa. I believe Bill Lawry had developed a sizable chip on his shoulder before the summer of 1970-71.
Richard Whitington

Bill Lawry succeeded his opening partner Bobby Simpson as Australian captain midway through the victorious 4-0 series victory over India in 1967-68, he retained the Ashes 1-1 in 1968 and defeated the West Indies 3-1 in 1968-69. The 1969-70 the tour of India was successful -  Australia won 3-1 - but the non-smoking, non-drinking Lawry had little time for the social side of the tour, was unable to maintain good public relations and manager Fred Bennett submitted an unfavourable report. In the subsequent tour of South Africa he lost 4-0 and he sent the Australian Cricket Board a list of player grievances. According to vice-captain Ian Chappell, "That was the end of Lawry as captain of Australia. Then it was just a matter of finding any excuse to get rid of him". In 1970-71 he was determined to retain the Ashes, but chose to do this by batting every match into a draw and was criticised by his cautious, negative captaincy. With a victory required in the final Test to even the series and retain The Ashes the selectors dismissed Lawry, the first time an Australian captain had been dropped in mid-series. They failed to inform Lawry, who heard the news on the radio and was soon besieged by reporters. He accepted the verdict with his usual stoicism, but it was the end of his Test career and Australia lost a great opening batsman aged only 33. His successor Ian Chappell was far more aggressive and inspirational captain, but lost the last Test and with it The Ashes. However he recreated the Australian team in his own image and by 1974-75 it would be the most powerful Test team in the world.

Batting
On paper Australia had a sound batting line up; Bill Lawry (47.15), Ian Redpath (43.45), Keith Stackpole (37.42), Doug Walters (48.26), Ian Chappell (42.42), Greg Chappell (53.86), wicket-keeper Rod Marsh (26.51) and all-rounder Kerry O'Keeffe (25.76). None of these failed in the series, but the state batsmen who were called up to fill in the gaps were not capable of facing the English bowling attack. Although they batted out a draw in four of the Tests they collapsed twice in the second innings of the Sydney Tests, the only wicket that did not favour the bat. Bill Lawry was a dour left-handed opening batsman with tremendous concentration who was once unfairly described as "a corpse with pads on". He failed to make a century, but still made 324 runs (40.50) and carried his bat through the Australian debacle at Sydney. John Snow wrote that 'He always had to be got out and even if you managed to knock all three stumps over he still stayed at the crease a moment looking round for some excuse to continue batting before reluctantly starting his walk back to the dressing room'. Keith Stackpole was a heavily built opening batsman perfectly capable of hitting the ball round the ground, he made 627 runs (52.25) and two centuries in the series, but had the benefit of five "lives" from the umpires. Ian Redpath was another opening batsman, but tall and ungainly, making 497 safe runs (49.70) at his own slow pace, "I liked bowling to him least of all" Snow wrote, "a real nuisance batsman". Greg Chappell said he was one of only two players he knew who would kill to get into the Australian Test team. The other was wicket-keeper Rod Marsh who was chosen for his batting skills rather than his glovemanship. Despite being right-handed in everything else he batted left-handed and was a very powerful hitter of the ball. The entertaining Doug Walters made 205 not out for New South Wales against the tourists and 112 in the First Test, but had developed a distaste for fast bowling in South Africa and John Snow took advantage of his cavalier play by feeding him short balls on the off-stump with a pair of gully fielders. Ian Chappell would later say "three bouncers an over should be worth 12 runs to me"., as a result of working on his hook shot after his encounters with John Snow, but he still made 452 runs (37.66) and two fighting centuries in the series. His younger brother Greg would be regarded as the best Australian batsmen for decades, but in this series was limited to leg-side play and could not hope to match his famous maiden Test century in the later games.

Bowling
As with their batting Australia could muster a strong and varied bowling attack; Garth McKenzie (29.78), Dennis Lillee (23.92), Alan Connolly (29.22), Ashley Mallett (29.84), John Gleeson (36.20) and Terry Jenner (31.20) with all-rounders Doug Walters (29.08), Kerry O'Keeffe (38.20) and Greg Chappell (40.70). Unfortunately, they were seldom given the chance to settle into the team and only Gleeson of the regular bowlers played in five Tests. Garth McKenzie had been Australia's premier fast bowler in the 1960s, but had failed spectacularly in South Africa (averaging 333.00), was struck in the face by a John Snow bouncer at Sydney and retired from Test cricket to play for Ray Illingworth's Leicestershire as a professional. Alan Connolly had been a fast bowler in his youth, but slowed his pace to increase his accuracy and became a reliable support bowler. Alan Thomson - "Froggie" Thomson - was a fast-medium paceman with a "strange, whirlwind, running-through sort of action" in which he loosed the ball while both feet were in the air. He was a non-smoking, non-drinking, physical education teacher whose shaggy red hair make him look like a 'Wild Man of Borneo'. He frequently bounced the England batsmen, took 6/80 against the MCC for Victoria and was called up for the First Test. 'He can't last' predicted Richard Whitington, 'He doesn't even know where he's aiming', and he averaged 54.50 in the Tests. John Gleeson was a mystery bowler who used his bent middle finger to turn the ball either way, but lost control in search of variation and was punished by the England batsmen once they figured out his action. The more orthodox off-spinner Ashley Mallett could turn the ball very sharply and took 28 wickets (19.10) in India in 1969-70. Tom Graveney thought he was the finest Australian off-spinner since the war and he became the spinning arm of Ian Chappell's all-conquering Australians. Historically Australian selectors always preferred a leg-spinner and Kerry O'Keeffe and Terry Jenner vied for the place, but they never quite fulfilled their promise. Doug Walters was a part-time bowler, but his medium-paced "Golden Arm" was capable of breaking any partnership and he deserved to be regarded an all-rounder. Greg Chappell was also seen as an all-rounder in his youth, and continued to bowl throughout his Test career, but mainly to tie up one end while the other bowlers rested. The greatest Australian bowler of the next decade would be Dennis Lillee, but in 1970 he was a raw, undisciplined fast bowler who had yet to reach his full potential.

Fielding
The Australians have always produced good fielding teams and this was no exception, though Rod Marsh left a lot to be desired. His missed several chances in the first Test and was nicknamed "Iron Gloves" due to his inability to take the ball cleanly. He dropped three catches in the First Test, but held onto four others and would later develop into one of cricket's great wicket-keepers. Keith Stackpole and the Chappell brothers were superb slip-fielders, Ashley Mallett a specialist in the gully and Ian Redpath a remarkable close fielder anywhere.

Test Statistics

First Test - Brisbane

See Main Article - 1970-71 Ashes series

Second Test - Perth

See Main Article - 1970-71 Ashes series

Third Test - Melbourne

See Main Article - 1970-71 Ashes series

First One Day International - Melbourne

See Main Article - 1970-71 Ashes series

Fourth Test - Sydney

See Main Article - 1970-71 Ashes series

Fifth Test - Melbourne

See Main Article - 1970-71 Ashes series

Sixth Test - Adelaide

See Main Article - 1970-71 Ashes series

Seventh Test - Sydney

See Main Article - 1970-71 Ashes series

References

Bibliography
 John Arlott, John Arlott's 100 Greatest Batsman, Macdonald Queen Anne Press, 1986
 Ashley Brown, A Pictorial History of Cricket, Bison Books Ltd, 1988
 Greg Chappell, Old Hands Showed The Way, Test Series Official Book 1986-87, The Clashes For The Ashes, Australia vs England, Playbill Sport Publication, 1986
 Ian Chappell, Austin Robertson and Paul Rigby, Chappelli Has the Last Laugh, Lansdowne Press, 1980
 Cris Freddi, The Guinness Book of Cricket Blunders, Guinness Publishing, 1996
 David Gower, Heroes and Contemporaries, Granada Publishing Ltd, 1985
 Tom Graveney and Norman Miller, The Ten Greatest Test Teams, Sidgewick and Jackson, 1988
 John Snow, Cricket Rebel: An Autobiography, Littlehampton Book Services Ltd, 1976
 E.W. Swanton, Swanton in Australia with MCC 1946-75, Fontant, 1977

Annual reviews
 Playfair Cricket Annual 1971
 Wisden Cricketers' Almanack 1971

Further reading
 Geoffrey Boycott, Boycott: The Autobiography, Pan Books, 2006
 Mark Browning, Rod Marsh: A Life in Cricket, Rosenberg Publishing, 2003
 Ian Brayshaw, The Chappell Era, ABC Enterprises, 1984
 Ian Chappell and Ashley Mallett, Hitting Out: The Ian Chappell Story, Orion, 2006
 Chris Cowdrey and Jonathan Smith, Good Enough, Pelham Books, 1986
 Colin Cowdrey, M. C. C. The Autobiography of a Cricketer, Coronet Books, 1977
 Basil d'Oliveira, Time to Declare: An Autobiography, Star, 1982
 Basil d'Oliveira, Basil d'Oliveira: Cricket and Controversy, Sphere, 2005
 Bill Frindall, The Wisden Book of Test Cricket 1877-1978, Wisden, 1979
 Colin Firth, Pageant of Cricket, The MacMillan Company of Australia,1987
 Chris Harte, A History of Australian Cricket, Andre Deutsch, 1993
 Ed Jaggard, Garth: The Story of Graham McKenzie, Fremantle Arts Centre Press, 1993
 Ken Kelly and David Lemmon, Cricket Reflections: Five Decades of Cricket Photographs, Heinemann, 1985
 Dennis Lillee, Lillee, My Life in Cricket, Methuen Australia, 1982
 Dennis Lillee, Menace: the Autobiography, Headline Book Publishing, 2003
 Brian Luckhurst and Mike Baldwin, Boot Boy to President, KOS Media, 2004
 Ashley Mallett, Rowdy, Lynton Publications, 1973
 Ashley Mallett, Spin Out, Garry Sparke & Associates, 1977
 Ashley Mallett, One Of A Kind: The Doug Walters Story, Orion, 2009
 Rod Marsh, The Gloves of Irony, Pan, 1999
 Adrian McGregor, Greg Chappell, Collins, 1985
 Mark Peel, The Last Roman: A Biography of Colin Cowdrey, Andre Deutsch Ltd, 1999
 Ray Robinson, On Top Down Under, Cassell, 1975
 Lou Rowan, The Umpires Story with an Analysis of the laws of cricket, Jack Pollard, 1972
 Keith Stackpole and Alan Trenglove, Not Just For Openers, Stockwell Press, 1974
 Mike Stevenson, Illy: A Biography Of Ray Illingworth, Midas Books, 1978
 E.W. Swanton (ed), The Barclays World of Cricket, Collins, 1986
 Derek Underwood, Beating the Bat: An Autobiography, S.Paul, 1975
 Bob Willis, Lasting the Pace, Collins, 1985

Video
 Allan Border and David Gower, The Best Of The Ashes - 1970 - 1987, 2 Entertain Video, 1991

DVD
 David Steele, England Cricket Six of the Best: The Seventies, A Sharpe Focus Production for Green Umbrella, 2009 (showing England's 299 run victory in the Fourth Test at Sydney in 1970-71)

External links
 CricketArchive tour itinerary

1970 in Australian cricket
1971 in Australian cricket
1970–71 Australian cricket season